Sir Christopher Antoniou Pissarides  (born 20 February 1948) is a Cypriot economist. He is the School Professor of Economics & Political Science and Regius Professor of Economics at the London School of Economics, and Professor of European Studies at the University of Cyprus. His research focuses on topics of macroeconomics, notably labour, economic growth, and economic policy. In 2010, he was awarded the Nobel Prize in Economics, jointly with Peter A. Diamond and Dale Mortensen, "for their analysis of markets with theory of search frictions."

Early life

Pissarides was born in Nicosia, Cyprus, into a Greek Orthodox family from the village of Agros.

Pissarides was educated at the Pancyprian Gymnasium in Nicosia. He earned  bachelor's and master's degrees in economics from the University of Essex in 1970 and 1971, and a PhD in economics from the London School of Economics in 1973, under the supervision of the mathematical economist Michio Morishima for a thesis entitled "Individual behaviour in markets with imperfect information."

Career

Pissarides is Regius Professor of Economics at the London School of Economics, where he has been since 1976. He is chairman of the Centre for Macroeconomics, which deploys economists from the University of Cambridge, the London School of Economics, the University College London, the Bank of England, and the National Institute of Economic and Social Research.

He has held a lectureship at the University of Southampton (1974–76), and visiting professorships at Harvard University (1979–80) and the University of California, Berkeley (1990–91).

He served as the chairman of the National Economy Council of the Republic of Cyprus during the country's financial crisis in 2012, and resigned to focus on his academic work at the end of 2014. 

In 2018, in collaboration with Naomi Climer and Anna Thomas, he set up the Institute for the Future of Work, a London-based research and development institute exploring how new technologies are transforming work and working lives.  

In February 2020, Greek prime minister Kyriakos Mitsotakis picked Pissarides to chair a committee tasked with drafting a long-term growth strategy for the country. From September 2020 he is chairman of the economic council of EuroAfrica Interconnector.

In June 2021, it was announced that he would lead a review into the future of work and wellbeing, a three-year collaboration between the Institute for the Future of Work, Imperial College London and Warwick Business School, funded by a £1.8 million grant from the Nuffield Foundation. The Pissarides Review into the Future of Work and Wellbeing was launched in March 2022.

Academic contributions

Pissarides is mostly known for his contributions to the search and matching theory for studying the interactions between the labour market and the macro economy. He helped develop the concept of the matching function (explaining the flows from unemployment to employment at a given moment of time), and pioneered the empirical work on its estimation. Pissarides has also done research on structural change and growth.

One of his most well-known papers is "Job Creation and Job Destruction in the Theory of Unemployment" (with Dale Mortensen), published in the Review of Economic Studies in 1994. The paper was built on the previous individual contributions that both authors had made over the previous two decades.

The Mortensen–Pissarides model that resulted from the paper has been exceptionally influential in modern macroeconomics. In one or another of its extensions or variations, it is now part of the core of most graduate economics curricula throughout the world.

Pissarides's book Equilibrium Unemployment Theory, a standard reference in the literature of the macroeconomics of unemployment, is now in its second edition and was revised after his joint work with Mortensen resulted in the analysis of both endogenous job creation and destruction.

Awards and honours

 Fellow of the Econometric Society, 1997
 Fellow of the British Academy, 2002
 Fellow of the European Economic Association, 2005
 IZA Prize in Labor Economics, jointly with Dale Mortensen, 2005
 Foreign Honorary Member of the American Economic Association, 2011
 Vice-president of the European Economic Association, President in 2011
 Nobel Prize in Economics in 2010, jointly with Dale Mortensen, Peter A. Diamond, for "analysis of markets with search frictions"
 The College Historical Society of Trinity College Dublin awarded Pissarides its Gold Medal for Outstanding Contribution to Public Discourse in 2012
 In 2013, Knighted in the 2013 Birthday Honours for "services to economics."
 Member of the Academy of Athens, 2015

Selected works

 
 
 
 
  Description and chapter-preview links.

References

External links

 Christopher A Pissarides personal page at London School of Economics
 Christopher Pissarides' personal website
  including the Nobel lecture on 8 December 2010 Equilibrium in the Labour Market with Search Frictions
 Profile and Papers at Research Papers in Economics/RePEc
 Christopher Pissarides  commemorative postage stamp issued from the Cyprus Post Office, 8 June 2011

1948 births
Living people
Cypriot Nobel laureates
Cypriot economists
Labor economists
Members of the Academy of Athens (modern)
Fellows of the Econometric Society
Fellows of the British Academy
Knights Bachelor
Nobel laureates in Economics
20th-century  British economists
21st-century  British economists
Alumni of the London School of Economics
Alumni of the University of Essex
Academics of the London School of Economics
Academics of the University of Southampton
Academic staff of the Hong Kong University of Science and Technology
Eastern Orthodox Christians from Cyprus
People educated at Pancyprian Gymnasium
People from Nicosia
People from Limassol District
Academic staff of the University of Cyprus
Naturalised citizens of the United Kingdom